National Tertiary Route 712, or just Route 712 (or ) is a National Road Route of Costa Rica, located in the Alajuela province.

Description
In Alajuela province the route covers Alajuela canton (San Isidro, Sabanilla districts).

References

Highways in Costa Rica